The Pajani System was a system of appointing government officials in Nepal.

History 

The Pajani System has deep roots in history of Nepal and has been used by Licchavi, Malla, and  Early Shah, Rana period rulers.

The Pajani System ended in late 1970s.

Procedure 

In the Pajani System, the Head of State could directly appoint, transfer or dismiss government servants. Annual Pajani ceremonies were held and re-appointment and dismissal of the officials was set for a period of one year, based on loyalty.

See also
Daudaha System(Nepal)
Rana dynasty
Rana palaces of Nepal
Rolls of Succession in Rana(Nepal)

References

History of Nepal
Rana palaces of Nepal
1970s disestablishments in Nepal